Enzo Lanzarini (born 14 October 1953) is an Italian rower. He competed in the men's coxless four event at the 1976 Summer Olympics.

References

External links
 

1953 births
Living people
Italian male rowers
Olympic rowers of Italy
Rowers at the 1976 Summer Olympics
Sportspeople from the Province of Treviso